Crispin M. Shumina is a member of the Pan-African Parliament from Zambia.

References

External links
Pan-African Parliament members

Members of the Pan-African Parliament from Zambia
Living people
Year of birth missing (living people)